Buller's moth (Aoraia mairi) is a possibly extinct moth that is endemic to New Zealand.  It is known from a single specimen caught in the Ruahine Range by Sir Walter Buller while on an expedition searching for the huia in the summer of 1867. Buller named it Porina mairi in honour of his brother-in-law Captain Gilbert Mair.  Buller described the species as having a wingspan of almost 6 inches (150 mm). It is this wingspan that rules out the specimen being associated with species such as Dumbletonius characterifer.

The specimen was sent to the British Museum on the Assaye in 1890.  Although this ship was reported as sinking, this happened on its return journey from Britain. This implies that the specimen did make it to Britain. However the present location of the moth specimen is currently unknown.

In 1975 two caterpillars were collected in the Ōrongorongo River valley and appeared to be new to science. Scientists were unable to confirm whether they were the caterpillars of Buller's moth or were a new species of giant moth, despite attempts to raise the caterpillars to maturity. Subsequent study of these specimens indicated they belong to either D. characterifer or Aoraia enysii.

Conservation status
A. mairi was classed as "unevaluated" in Department of Conservation Threat Classification lists. This was as a result of the type specimen of the species being destroyed or lost and that the species has remained unrecognised since its description.

References

Moths of New Zealand
Endemic fauna of New Zealand
Moths described in 1872
Taxa named by Walter Buller
Endemic moths of New Zealand